Rhachitheciaceae is a family of haplolepideous mosses (Dicranidae)s in the order Dicranales. It consists of seven genera.

Genera

The family Rhachitheciaceae contains seven genera:

Hypnodontopsis 
Jonesiobryum 
Rhachitheciopsis 
Rhachithecium 
Tisserantiella 
Uleastrum 
Zanderia

References

Moss families
Dicranales